Black Smith is a 1974 album by jazz musician Jimmy Smith. Produced by Jerry Peters and Michael Viner

Track listing
"Hang 'Em High"  (Dominique Frontiere) 6:17
"I'm Gonna Love You Just a Little Bit More Baby"  (Barry White) 4:31
"Joy"  (Johann Sebastian Bach) 3:30
"Ooh Poo Pah Doo"  (Jessie Hill) 3:11
"Why Can't We Live Together"  (Timmy Thomas) 5:26
"Groovin'"  (Eddie Brigati, Felix Cavaliere) 3:03
"Pipeline"  (Bob Spickard, Brian Carman) 7:58
"Wildflower"  (David Richardson, Doug Edwards) 6:05
"Something You Got"  (Chris Kenner) 4:00

External links
 Jimmy-Smith-Black-Smith at Discogs

1974 albums
Albums produced by Jerry Peters
Jazz-funk albums
Jazz fusion albums by American artists
MGM Records albums